Ron Jones may refer to:
Ron Jones (television director) (1945–1995), British television director
Ron Jones (teacher) (born 1941), American writer and teacher, known for his classroom experiment in Fascism
Ron Jones (composer) (born 1954), American composer for TV shows
Ron Jones (athlete) (born 1934), Welsh track and field athlete
Ron Jones (baseball) (1964–2006), 1980s baseball player for the Philadelphia Phillies
Ron Jones (ice hockey) (born 1951), retired Canadian 1970s ice hockey player
Ron Jones (American football) (born 1947), 1960s American football player
Ron Jones (commentator), Welsh-born BBC radio sports commentator
Ron Jones (businessman) (born 1948), British businessman with Tinopolis
Ron Jones (footballer) (1914–2010), Welsh footballer

See also
Ronald Jones (disambiguation)